Vavoom may refer to:

TV
Miss Vavoom, character in 1990–1993 American television series Tom & Jerry Kids
Vavoom, character in 1959–1961 American television series Felix the Cat
Vavoom (TV channel) airing in Balkan countries

Music
"Vavoom: Ted the Mechanic", 1996 song by British band Deep Purple
Vavoom!, 2000 album by American band The Brian Setzer Orchestra
"Vavoom", song from Resident. Two Years of Oakenfold at Cream.
"Vavoom", song by Prince from The Chocolate Invasion

See also

Va Va Voom (disambiguation)